Aphaenops carrerei is a species of beetle in the subfamily Trechinae. It was described by Coiffait in 1953.

References

carrerei
Beetles described in 1953